The 1979 Illinois State Redbirds football team represented Illinois State University as an independent during the 1979 NCAA Division I-A football season. Led by third-year head coach Charlie Cowdrey, the Redbirds compiled a record of 3–8. Illinois State played home games at Hancock Stadium in Normal, Illinois.

Schedule

Roster

References 

Illinois State Redbirds football seasons
Illinois State
Illinois State Redbirds football